Andreas Englund (born 21 January 1996) is a Swedish professional ice hockey defenceman for the  Chicago Blackhawks of the National Hockey League (NHL). Englund was selected by the Ottawa Senators in the second round (40th overall) of the 2014 NHL Entry Draft.

Playing career
Englund made his professional debut in the 2013–14 season, with his youth club Djurgårdens IF of the then HockeyAllsvenskan. Following the club's promotion Englund made his Swedish Hockey League (SHL) during the 2014–15 season, appearing in 49 games for five points in his rookie campaign.

After two full seasons in the SHL marking 95 appearances, Englund left Sweden to pursue his NHL ambitions by signing a three-year, entry-level contract with the Ottawa Senators on 5 April 2016. On 3 December 2016, Englund made his NHL debut with the Senators in a 2–0 victory over the Florida Panthers.

As an impending restricted free agent with the Senators, and facing a delayed  North American season, Englund opted to remain in Sweden by agreeing to a season long contract with Västerviks IK of the HockeyAllsvenskan on 20 September 2020. Through injury, Englund did not feature with the club, and he sat out the season in its entirety.

With the right's relinquished by the Senators after not receiving a qualifying offer, Englund opted to resume his professional career in North America, agreeing to a one-year AHL contract with the Colorado Eagles, the primary affiliate to the Colorado Avalanche on 28 July 2021. In the 2021–22 season, Englund re-established his career by featuring in a regular role on the Ealges blueline as a defensive defenceman. He registered two goals and 12 points through 57 games to help the Eagles reach the playoffs.

As a free agent, Englund was signed to continue within the Avalanche organization by signing a one-year, two-way NHL contract on 13 July 2022. He was returned to the Eagles following training camp to begin the  season. He featured in 12 games with the Eagles before he was recalled to the NHL by the Avalanche due to a rash of injuries on 13 November 2022. He made his debut with the Avalanche the following day, marking his first NHL game in over two years, by featuring in a third-pairing role in a 3–2 defeat by the St. Louis Blues. With the Avalanche blighted through continual injuries, Englund remained with the club and solidified a role as a defensive defenceman within the blueline and contributed with three assists through 36 games.

On 26 February 2023, approaching the trade deadline, Englund was dealt to the rebuilding Chicago Blackhawks in exchange for the return of Jack Johnson to the Avalanche.

Career statistics

Regular season and playoffs

International

References

External links
 

1996 births
Living people
Belleville Senators players
Binghamton Senators players
Chicago Blackhawks players
Colorado Avalanche players
Colorado Eagles players
Djurgårdens IF Hockey players
Ice hockey people from Stockholm
Ottawa Senators draft picks
Ottawa Senators players
Swedish expatriate ice hockey players in Canada
Swedish expatriate ice hockey players in the United States
Swedish ice hockey defencemen